Natalia Vladimirovna Petkevich ( Natallya Uladzimirawna Pyatkevich;  Natalya Vladimirovna Petkevich; born 1972) is a Belarusian politician who served formerly as the First Deputy Head of the Administration of the President of Belarus.

Biography

Natalia Petkevich was born in Minsk. In 1994, she graduated from the Faculty of Law of the Belarusian State University. In 1998, she earned the degree of Doctor of Juridical Science. Joining the Administration of the President of Belarus, she came to serve as Chief for the Administration of State and International Law of the Administration of the President of Belarus. In 2001, she was appointed Press Secretary of the President of Belarus.  Then, in 2004, she was appointed Deputy Head of the Administration of the President of Belarus. Natalia Petkevich has been called the "Iron Lady" of Belarus, and has been considered a potential successor to President Alexander Lukashenko. On 10 April 2006, following the 2006 presidential election in Belarus, she was placed on a list of over 40 members of the Belarusian government banned from entering the European Union and the United States for allegedly participating in the manipulation of the results of the presidential election; the ban was temporarily lifted in 2008. In 2009, she was appointed First Deputy Head of the Administration of the President of Belarus.

Personal life
In 2009, she married Alexander Martinenko, Deputy Chairman of the National State Television and Radio Company of the Republic of Belarus.

References

External links
Who is who in Belarus 
The Successor of Lukashenko could be the "Iron Lady" of Belarus - Natalia Petkevich 
The Successor of Lukashenko could be the "Iron Lady" of Belarus - Natalia Petkevich 

1972 births
Living people
Politicians from Minsk
Belarusian people of Russian descent
21st-century Belarusian women politicians
21st-century Belarusian politicians
Belarusian State University alumni
Presidential Administration of Belarus
Belarusian individuals subject to the U.S. Department of the Treasury sanctions
Specially Designated Nationals and Blocked Persons List